Częstochowa Stradom railway station is one of two major railway stations in Częstochowa, Silesian Voivodeship, Poland, the other station being the Częstochowa railway station. As of 2022, it is served by Polregio (local and InterRegio services) and PKP Intercity (EIP, InterCity, and TLK services).

Train services

The station is served by the following services:

Express Intercity Premium services (EIP) Warsaw - Wrocław
Express Intercity services (EIC) Warsaw - Wrocław 
Intercity services (IC) Warszawa  - Częstochowa - Opole - Wrocław 
Intercity services (IC) Białystok - Warszawa - Częstochowa - Opole - Wrocław
Intercity services (IC) Poznań - Ostrów Wielkopolski - Kępno - Lubliniec - Częstochowa - Kraków 
Intercity services (IC) Zielona Góra - Wrocław - Opele - Częstochowa - Kraków - Rzeszów - Przemyśl
Intercity services (TLK) Warszawa - Częstochowa - Lubliniec - Opole - Wrocław - Szklarska Poręba Górna
Intercity services (TLK) Poznań - Ostrów Wielkopolski - Kępno - Lubliniec - Częstochowa - Kraków 
Intercity services (TLK) Lublin Główny — Świnoujście
Regional Service (PR) Częstochowa – Lubliniec
Regional Service (PR) Częstochowa – Lubliniec - Kluckzbork - Namysłów
Regional Service (KŚ)  Częstochowa – Lubliniec

References 

Station article at  koleo.pl

Railway stations in Silesian Voivodeship
Railway stations served by Przewozy Regionalne InterRegio
Buildings and structures in Częstochowa
Railway stations in Poland opened in 1911